Hässelby Gård is a suburban district belonging to the Hässelby-Vällingby borough in Stockholm, Sweden. The district had a population of 8,620 in 2005. The station was inaugurated in 1956 as the west terminus of the extension from Vällingby. In November 1958 the line was extended further west to Hässelby strand.

See also
Hässelby Castle
Hässelby gård metro station

References

Districts in Västerort

de:Hässelby gård (Stockholm Tunnelbana)
pl:Hässelby gård (stacja metra)